Haris Epaminonda (born 1980 in Nicosia) is a Cypriot photographer and visual artist who lives and works in Berlin.

Career
Epaminonda's work has been displayed in exhibitions at the Schirn Kunsthalle Frankfurt, Tate Modern, Hamburger Bahnhof, Tel Aviv Museum of Art, the Berlin Biennale, and the Venice Biennale. In 2011, she had her first museum exhibition at the Museum of Modern Art in New York.

At the 2019 Venice Biennale, Epaminonda won the Silver Lion for promising young participant in the central exhibition.

Art market
Epaminonda is represented by Rodeo Gallery in London and Piraeus.

References 

1980 births
Living people
Cypriot artists